Teriberka River is a river in the north of the Kola Peninsula in Murmansk Oblast, Russia. It flows into the Barents Sea about 50 km east of Murmansk.

There are two hydroelectric power stations on the Teriberka River, with a total capacity of 157 MW and an annual production of 290 GWh. The village of Teriberka is located at its mouth.

References

Rivers of Murmansk Oblast
Drainage basins of the Barents Sea